The Lexham English Bible (LEB) is an online Bible released by Logos Bible Software. The New Testament was published in October 2010 and has an audio narration spoken by Marv Allen. It lists as General Editor W. Hall Harris, III. The Old Testament translation was completed in 2011.

According to its foreword, the translator's intent was to achieve:

The LEB is relatively literal and was derived from an interlinear translation of the Greek NT. An unusual feature of the LEB is the use of corner brackets to mark idioms in the English translation. Italics are used to indicate words supplied by the translator with no direct equivalent in the underlying Greek. However there are instances where instead of giving a literal translation of a word it gives us its dynamic equivalent. For example in Mark 3:3, the Greek word Ἔγειρε is translated as "come". The literal translation should be "Arise" or "get up" or "stand" but LEB translates the word as "come". The LEB does not provide any footnote or explanation that why instead of "Arise" or "Stand" another word, which is not literal is used.

At its release, it included only the New Testament and was simultaneously offered for free use to Logos users as well as other popular software suites, including freeware such as e-Sword and The SWORD Project. These were later updated to include the Old Testament. It can also be accessed in its entirety on websites listed below. The LEB is available under a very permissive license which allows royalty-free commercial and non-commercial use.

References

External links
 

2010 non-fiction books
Electronic Bibles
Bible translations into English
2010 in Christianity